College Basketball on NBC Sports is the de facto branding used for broadcasts of NCAA Division I men's college basketball games produced by NBC Sports, the sports division of the NBC television network in the United States. The NBC network broadcast college basketball games in some shape or form between 1969 and 1998. From 1969 to 1981, NBC covered the NCAA Division I men's basketball tournament. It became the first major network to broadcast the championship game, at a cost of more than US$500,000 in 1969.

In 2011, Comcast's sports channel Versus became part of NBC Sports after the company's acquisition of NBC Universal, and was relaunched as NBC Sports Network (NBCSN) in 2012. During the 2010's, NBCSN primarily carried coverage of basketball from the Atlantic 10 Conference, Colonial Athletic Association (CAA), and Ivy League. 

NBCSN would lose the CAA and Ivy League, but retained its A-10 package. It was renewed in 2021 under a multi-year deal, and moved to USA Network in January 2022 after the shutdown of NBCSN. In August 2022, NBC Sports announced that it had acquired rights to Big Ten basketball as part of a larger agreement with the conference, with a package of games airing on Peacock beginning in the 2023–24 season.

On November 12, 2022, college basketball returned to the main NBC network when the Notre Dame women's college basketball team took on the California women's college basketball team as part of the inaugural Citi Shamrock Classic. It was the first women's college basketball game to ever air on NBC, and the first college basketball game of any kind since 1998.

History
NBC's relationship with college basketball dates as far back as February 28, 1940, when W2XBS (the future flagship station for NBC, WNBC) presented a doubleheader at New York City's Madison Square Garden. The University of Pittsburgh faced off against Fordham University, followed by Georgetown University against New York University.

1969–1976
For NBC's first year of tournament coverage in 1969, the network aired the consolation game nationally and the national semi-finals on a regional basis (which were held on a Thursday night). 1972 marked the final year that NBC aired the consolation game. The following year marked the first time that the Final Four was held on a Saturday, and was the first prime time championship game to air on NBC.

From 1969 to 1972, Final Four contests were split national telecasts. Because the NCAA Tournament wasn't seeded, but based on geography, the Final Four generally had two eastern and two western teams. NBC, with a prime-time slot, televised the eastern-oriented game in the east, and the western-oriented game in the west. It essentially was a split-national telecast, with the split occurring over the time, not simultaneous games. This inevitably created problems, such as when Louisville played UCLA in the late game in 1972, people in the east didn't see it. And, if the first game went into overtime, NBC couldn't close out the eastern window and open the western window. The western United States would get the end of the early game, but the east would still not get to see the late game. The secondary problem was that the east didn't get to see UCLA in the tournament until the title game.

By 1974, NBC was providing coverage of nine games in seven windows (a far cry from the current tournament coverage). 1974 also marked the first year that Billy Packer helped commentate an NCAA tournament game, starting a streak continued well into the 2000s. The following year, NBC aired ten games in nine windows – presenting the regional finals as a tripleheader with regional coverage in the middle time slot; this was also the first year that Billy Packer covered the Final Four. The 1974 NCAA tournament started the afternoon of March 9 with a doubleheader on NBC. The ACC and Pac 8 had first round byes, and these leagues were still staging conference tournament and regular season action after the NCAA tournament started.

NBC did not start airing regular season games until about 1975–76, when the network partnered with the ad-hoc sports service TVS Television Network. While NBC Sports' on-air talent was used, the production was covered by TVS. By this point, NBC would air regional and national games on Saturdays, and national games (called by Dick Enberg, Al McGuire and Billy Packer) on Sundays. As for the regional telecasts on Saturdays, typically in the Northeast, before the game featuring the Big East or Atlantic 10 conferences, it was the "ECAC Game of the Week".

In Dick Enberg's book Oh My!, he says that the first time that he worked with Billy Packer was on a UCLA-Maryland game in 1974. Meanwhile, Packer's book Hoops says that the first time these two worked together was on a UCLA @ Maryland game on Super Bowl Sunday 1975. Packer however, is incorrect on the date because these teams did not play on January 12, 1975 (nor on any other Super Bowl Sunday for that matter) and there was no national college basketball telecast on this date either. Packer spends a few pages on this telecast which he says was a joint production between TVS and Chesley and talks about meeting Enberg for the first time earlier that day. He also says that Enberg called play-by-play for one half and Jim Thacker did play-by-play for the other half and that Packer was the analyst throughout.

For the 1975 tournament, NBC expanded the regional finals coverage to present a tripleheader with regionalized coverage in the middle time slot. NBC used Tim Ryan and Al McGuire in the studio on March 22. 1975 also marked the first year that Billy Packer would work on the Final Four.

Coverage of the 1976 tournament served as an awkward transition period from Curt Gowdy to Dick Enberg. Although Enberg was NBC's lead college basketball play-by-play announcer during the regular season, Gowdy had a clause in his contract to do the NCAA championship game. As a compromise, NBC decided to put each of them on one national semi-final game along with Billy Packer. Then for the title game, both play-by-play voices worked together while Packer was relegated to the network's New York City studio (where he worked with Bryant Gumbel and Lee Leonard).

1977–1981
For the 1976–77 season, NBC moved the national games to Sundays, starting with a doubleheader on January 2-Michigan @ South Carolina then Houston @ UCLA. NBC provided split-national coverage of two games each on February 6 (Providence @ Louisville and Marquette @ Cincinnati) and February 20 (North Carolina @ Virginia and Indiana @ Purdue). NBC added a Saturday game on the last weekend of the season to show undefeated San Francisco take on Notre Dame. That weekend, Billy Packer called three ACC tournament games in Greensboro on Thursday March 3, both ACC semi-finals the next night, then went to South Bend to call San Francisco-Notre Dame game on Saturday afternoon. He went back to Greensboro to call the ACC title game that same night, and then went to Ann Arbor to call the Marquette-Michigan game the next day.

NBC added first round Sunday coverage during the 1977 tournament.   
 
In the 1977–78 season, C.D. Chesley (who controlled the Atlantic Coast Conference (ACC) rights at the time) wanted NBC to televise select ACC games as part of its national package as it had the previous few years. However, NBC wanted to feature intersectional games. This action greatly upset Chesley, who wound up selling the rights to the ACC Tournament final to ABC. As a result, there was a notable absence of ACC home games in NBC's college basketball schedule for the 1977–78 season. For this season, NBC added Al McGuire to the No. 1 team alongside Dick Enberg and Billy Packer. Early in the season, NBC stationed McGuire in a remote location and went to him only for periodic commentary. Eventually, NBC moved McGuire courtside to form a three-man announcer team. Dick Stockton filled in for Enberg on at least three games, Kentucky vs. Notre Dame (at Louisville on December 31), Marquette @ South Carolina (on February 5), and North Carolina @ Providence (on February 12). Enberg called the AFC title game in Denver on January 1 and had a boxing assignment on February 5.

In 1978, NBC aired all regional finals games nationally for the first time, moving two of the games to Sunday. NBC split up the analysts from its No. 1 announcer team for the first two weekends of the tournament. Al McGuire for the most part, worked with Curt Gowdy while Billy Packer generally worked with Dick Enberg. While Dick Enberg served as the play-by-play announcer for NBC's Final Four coverage in 1978, Curt Gowdy moved over to a hosting role for the Final Four coverage. Meanwhile, NCAA Productions covered all tournament games not televised by NBC. Merle Harmon, Jim Ferguson, Connie Alexander, Bill Strannigan, Jay Randolph, Gary Thompson, and Fred Taylor were the commentators for NCAA Productions. NCAA Productions carried also the consolation game with Jay Randolph and Gary Thompson on the call.

On February 25, 1979, NBC added a game featuring the undefeated Indiana State (which went up against Wichita State on that particular day). This was the first time that Larry Bird played on a national basketball telecast. Also in 1979, the tournament expanded to add Thursday and Friday first-round games (done by NCAA Productions, which also again produced the regional semi-finals). Like it did the previous year, NBC split up the analysts from its primary announcer team for the first two weekends of the tournament, with Jim Simpson (in his last year with NBC before moving on to the newly launched ESPN cable network) working with Billy Packer while Dick Enberg worked with Al McGuire.

On December 30, Dick Enberg called an NFL playoff game, so Simpson filled in him on the Kentucky-Notre Dame game (which was aired on tape delay at 11:30 p.m. Eastern time) at Louisville. Jim Simpson also filled-in for Enberg on the USC @ Texas game on January 20 because Enberg was scheduled to anchor NBC's Super Bowl coverage the next day.

NBC's coverage of the 1979 NCAA championship game between Indiana State and Michigan State to this day, remains the highest-rated game (garnering a 24.1 rating) in the history of televised college basketball. The final game marked the beginning of the rivalry between future Hall of Famers Magic Johnson and Larry Bird. Both Johnson and Bird would enter the NBA in the fall of 1979, and the rivalry between them and their respective teams (the Los Angeles Lakers and Boston Celtics) was a major factor in the league's renaissance in the 1980s and 1990s. The game also led to the "modern era" of college basketball, as it introduced a nationwide audience to a sport that was once relegated to second-class status in the sports world.

Both Dick Enberg and Don Criqui called NFL playoff games the weekend of December 29, 1979, so Charlie Jones filled in on the Kentucky-Notre Dame game (aired on tape delay). Enberg however, did not have an NFL assignment the weekend of December 15 (NBC aired DePaul @ UCLA) while Criqui did (Jets-Oilers). The February 17 game between Kentucky and UNLV, was a Sunday morning local start.

For two December games in 1980, Bob Costas filled in for Enberg (who was on NFL duty). The games were Indiana @ North Carolina (on the 20th) and UCLA @ DePaul the following week. Meanwhile, Charlie Jones filled in for Enberg on January 24 (Notre Dame @ Maryland) as Enberg was getting ready to call the Super Bowl the next day. On Super Bowl Sunday 1981, NBC broadcast the Ohio State-Virginia game (with Don Criqui doing play-by-play)at 1:30 pm. ET.

For the 1980 tournament, NBC only split up the analysts from its No. 1 announcer team for the first weekend. While Dick Enberg again teamed with Al McGuire, Billy Packer was this time, paired with Don Criqui.

In NBC's final year covering the NCAA tournament, 1981 (beginning on March 14 to be exact), the network introduced a policy of switching from game to game (and buzzer beater to buzzer beater, for that matter) on the fly. Before this, NBC would naturally, stay with the regionally-televised games to their conclusion. Bryant Gumbel was the studio host for NBC by this point. This time, NBC kept its No. 1 announcer team (Enberg/Packer/McGuire) intact for the entire tournament.

After losing the Division I basketball tournament rights (1982–1989)
After NBC lost the tournament rights to CBS (which started a separate regular season package) beginning in 1982, they continued with TVS through 1983, wrapping up with the ACC Tournament Final (which NBC had traditionally wrapped up their coverage with, by this point).

After TVS went back to broadcasting separate, regional games beginning in 1983–84 (in the 1986–87 season for instance, NBC carried several Pac-10 telecasts on a regional basis), NBC was left to pick up the games that CBS did not want (save for the ACC Final) for the rest of the 1980s.

During this period, NBC's promotional slogan for its game broadcasts was "College basketball, it's the stuff Saturdays are made of!" Another slogan that NBC used in game promotions was "Sunday come on home to college basketball on NBC!"

On January 27, 1985, Jim Valvano (who was still the NC State coach) called a game between Indiana and Illinois alongside Bob Costas for NBC after coaching a game the previous day.

On January 25, 1986, NBC had planned regional coverage of LSU @ Auburn in the 1 p.m. (Eastern) time slot (with Jack Givens as analyst). However, that game was postponed due to a chicken pox epidemic on the LSU campus, so NBC went national with the Louisville @ Kansas game (called by Jay Randolph and Bucky Waters). NBC used Pete Maravich on a few late season games such as DePaul @ UCLA on March 1 alongside Don Criqui.

Dick Enberg did not call a college basketball game for the 1989–90 season until February 24 (Georgia Tech @ Notre Dame).

Decline (1990–1998)
With CBS and ESPN gaining strength in the 1990s, all NBC could put together was a 4–5 game package featuring a then-mediocre Notre Dame program. By the 1992–93 season, NBC only broadcast two games, both involving Notre Dame (a February 6 contest against Duke, and a February 13 contest against Kentucky). NBC was seeing much more success with its broadcasts of Notre Dame football games than the team's basketball telecasts by this point.

On February 22, 1992, Al McGuire called his last game for NBC (UCLA @ Notre Dame). CBS signed McGuire for the NCAA tournament. In the 1993–94 season, NBC only aired one game, which was UCLA @ Notre Dame on February 5. Don Criqui called that particular game alongside John Andariese. As previously mentioned, the season prior, NBC only carried two games, Duke @ Notre Dame on February 6 (which Don Criqui called with Quinn Buckner) and Kentucky @ Notre Dame on February 13.

In the meantime, NBC also aired the Wooden Classic from 1994 to 1996, as well as occasionally showing non-Notre Dame related games such as those between the Oklahoma Sooners and Kansas Jayhawks in 1991, Virginia Cavaliers and North Carolina Tar Heels in 1992, Syracuse Orange-West Virginia Mountaineers in 1997 and 1998, and the Boston College Eagles and Georgetown Hoyas in 1998.

For the 1995 edition of the Wooden Classic, ABC regionally televised the first half of the doubleheader (Villanova vs. Purdue) with Roger Twibell and Dick Vitale on the call. At approximately 3:45 pm. Eastern time, NBC broadcast Maryland vs. UCLA for the second half with Don Criqui and Bill Walton on the call. On December 7, 1996, the first game of the Wooden Classic doubleheader (Utah vs. Arizona) tipped off at 1:45 pm, but NBC joined the action in progress at 2 p.m. for most of the country. This time, Don Criqui and Bill Walton were joined by Ann Meyers on commentary.

NBC's final men's college basketball broadcast to date was a February 28, 1998 contest between Notre Dame and the Providence Friars. NBC continues to maintain a broadcasting relationship with the university as it airs all Notre Dame football home games and select away games.

Coverage on cable and Peacock, Big Ten package (2011-present)
The NBC broadcast network does not currently televise any college basketball games. When Comcast and NBC Universal merged in 2011, college basketball on Versus was integrated into NBC Sports with the channel's relaunch as NBC Sports Network (NBCSN) on January 1, 2012. In 2012, NBC Sports reached agreements to carry Colonial Athletic Association (CAA) basketball and football on NBCSN and Comcast SportsNet, Atlantic 10 Conference (A-10) basketball on NBCSN, and renewed NBCSN's rights to the Ivy League for two additional seasons. By the late-2010s, NBC Sports had lost the CAA and Ivy League to other broadcasters. 

NBCSN continued its relationship with the A-10, which was most recently renewed in January 2021 under a multi-year deal. 25 regular season games are broadcast per-season, as well as selected games from the Atlantic 10 men's basketball tournament. NBCSN shut down at the end of 2021, after which USA Network assumed its A-10 broadcasts (among other sports properties). 

In August 2022, NBC Sports announced that it had reached a seven-year deal to carry Big Ten Conference athletics on its platforms, which will include a package of Big Ten men's and women's basketball games on Peacock beginning in the 2023–24 season. Peacock will air up to 47 men's basketball games and 30 women's basketball games per-season (including 32 and 20 intraconference games respectively), as well as the opening night doubleheaders of the men's and women's conference tournaments. 

NBC Sports carried two inaugural showcase games during the 2022–23 season; NBC aired the Citi Shamrock Classic on November 12, 2022, between Notre Dame and California's women's basketball teams. It marked the first women's college basketball game to ever air on NBC, and its first college basketball game overall since 1998. Peacock would sponsor and air the Peacock Classic on December 2, 2022, between Baylor and Gonzaga—a rematch of the 2021 national championship game.

2021-22 schedule

2022-23 schedule

Announcers

Play-by-play
Jason Knapp
Steve Schlanger
Mike Corey
Paul Burmeister
Zora Stephenson

Color commentary
Corey Robinson
Tim McCormick
Matt McCall
Julianne Viani
John Giannini
LaChina Robinson

Former cmmentator pairings

As previously mentioned, NBC and TVS were partners in televising college basketball from 1975 to 1983. Typically on Saturdays, NBC and TVS would broadcast a regional slate of college basketball from the various conferences.

See also
Men's college basketball on television
NCAA Men's Division I Basketball Championship#Television
College Football on NBC Sports
College Basketball on USA

References

External links

1969 American television series debuts
1998 American television series endings
Basketball on NBC
NBC original programming
NBC
1970s American television series
1980s American television series
NBC
TVS Television Network
NBCSN shows
Mountain West Conference basketball